Andrew Martens (born July 5, 1981) is a Canadian former professional ice hockey defenceman who most notably played for the Wichita Thunder of the then Central Hockey League.

Playing career
He played three seasons of college hockey at Bemidji State University before turning pro in the 2005–06 season. In the 2010–11 season with the Thunder, Martens scored 54 points in 65 games to be named Wichita's defenseman of the year and the CHL's most outstanding defenceman. He is a native of Calgary, Alberta.

On December 28, 2011, Martens signed a PTO with the Oklahoma City Barons of the American Hockey League.

After four seasons with Thunder and after the club were granted admission into the ECHL, Martens despite being team captain opted to retire from professional hockey prior to the 2014–15 season on October 9, 2014.

Career statistics

Awards and honours

References

External links
 

1981 births
Canadian ice hockey defencemen
American people of Canadian descent
Bemidji State Beavers men's ice hockey players
Lake Erie Monsters players
Living people
Manitoba Moose players
Oklahoma City Barons players
Ontario Reign (ECHL) players
Ice hockey people from Calgary
Toronto Marlies players
Wichita Thunder players